Delo may refer to:

People
 Ben Delo (born 1984), British entrepreneur
 Đelo Jusić (1939–2019), Croatian musician
 Ken Delo (1938–2016), American singer
 Layle Delo (born 1989), South African rugby union player
 Paul K. Delo, involved in the Schlup v. Delo United States Supreme Court case

Publications
 DELO, Russian Ukrainian newspaper
 Delo (newspaper), a Slovenian newspaper
 Delo (magazine), a Russian magazine

Other
 Delo, a brand of Chevron motor oil; a competitor of Shell Rotella
 DELO Industrial Adhesives
 Delo language, also known as Ntribu, Gur language spoken in Ghana and Togo